Nikolai Ivanovich Galushkin (22 January 1922 — 18 May 2007) was one of the top Soviet snipers during World War II. Despite tallying 418 fascists during the war and being nominated for the title Hero of the Soviet Union on two occasions, he did not receive the title, and was instead awarded the Order of Lenin for his achievements as a sniper until being awarded the title Hero of the Russian Federation on 21 June 1995.

Footnotes

References 

1922 births
2007 deaths
Heroes of the Russian Federation
People nominated for the title Hero of the Soviet Union
Recipients of the Order of Lenin
Recipients of the Order of the Red Banner
Soviet military snipers
Soviet military personnel of World War II